Rapps Bridge, also known as Rapps Dam Bridge, is one of fifteen surviving historic wooden covered bridges in Chester County, Pennsylvania. Rapps Bridge is located on Rapps Dam Road in East Pikeland Township. It has fieldstone abutments, horizontal siding and boxed cornices with returns at its portals. It is one of three covered bridges that cross French Creek, the others being Hall's Bridge and Kennedy Bridge.

It was listed on the National Register of Historic Places in 1973.

The Rapps Bridge was renovated in 1978 and again in 2011 for approximately 1.5 million dollars. On April 29, 2014, the bridge was heavily damaged when a tractor trailer crossed it. It re-opened in October 2015.

References 
 

Covered bridges on the National Register of Historic Places in Pennsylvania
Covered bridges in Chester County, Pennsylvania
Bridges completed in 1866
Wooden bridges in Pennsylvania
Bridges in Chester County, Pennsylvania
1866 establishments in Pennsylvania
National Register of Historic Places in Chester County, Pennsylvania
Road bridges on the National Register of Historic Places in Pennsylvania
Burr Truss bridges in the United States